Jusiyah al-Amar, or simply Jusiyah, is a Syrian village located in Al-Qusayr District, Homs, near the border of Lebanon.  According to the Syria Central Bureau of Statistics (CBS), Jusiyah al-Amar had a population of 3,447 in the 2004 census.

References 

Populated places in Homs Governorate